Ohio Wesleyan Female College was founded in 1853 in Delaware, Ohio. In 1877, the Ohio Wesleyan Female College merged with Ohio Wesleyan University.

History

It is one of the oldest institutions of higher education for women in the United States, which provided general educational opportunities to women in an era when co-educational institutions of higher learning were not yet fully open to students of both sexes. In 1855, funds for the school's first and only institutional building were obtained from Mary Monnett, a student who attended the school. The trustees named the main building Monnett Hall in her honor.

The main Wesleyan Female College Hall in Delaware, Ohio was razed in the late 1970s and the site is now occupied by Monnett Gardens. Wesleyan's annual celebration of spring, Monnett Weekend, is held each April.

Alumnae
Melissa Elizabeth Riddle Banta, poet
Sara Jane Crafts, educator, author, social reformer
Cornelia Cole Fairbanks, class 1872, Second Lady of the United States during the vice-presidency of her husband Charles W. Fairbanks
Flora Wambaugh Patterson, 1847–1928, mycologist at the USDA who worked on numerous important fungal diseases

See also
List of current and historical women's universities and colleges
List of Ohio Wesleyan University presidents

Defunct private universities and colleges in Ohio
Ohio Wesleyan University
Embedded educational institutions
Education in Delaware County, Ohio
History of women in Ohio